The Miss Perú 1992 pageant was held on April 12, 1992. That year, 20 candidates were competing for the national crown. The chosen winner represented Peru at the Miss Universe 1992 and at the Miss World 1992. The rest of the finalists would enter in different pageants.

Placements

Special Awards

 Best Regional Costume - Lambayeque - Giannina Olivares
 Miss Photogenic - Ancash - Susana Freire
 Miss Elegance - Amazonas - Lucrecia Arenas
 Miss Body - Callao - Mónika Saez Grimm
 Best Hair - USA Perú - Angie Shrimplin
 Miss Congeniality - Ucayali - Wendy Sarmiento
 Most Beautiful Face - Distrito Capital - Ingrid Yrivarren
 Miss Popularity - Piura - Roxana Falconí (by votes of readers of GENTE Magazine)

.

Delegates

Amazonas - Lucrecia Arenas
Ancash - Susana Freire
Arequipa - Aline Arce Santos
Cajamarca - Aracely Villa Contreras
Callao - Mónika Saez Grimm
Cuzco - Paloma La Hoz
Distrito Capital - Ingrid Yrivarren Paz
Huancavelica - Claudia Ortega
Huánuco - Betzabé Cacho Habich
Ica - María Eugenia Barco

Junín - Brigitte Duffoo
La Libertad - Ena De La Melena
Lambayeque - Giannina Olivares 
Madre de Dios - Jessica Tapia
Piura - Roxana Falconí Suárez
San Martín - Evelyn Villagrán
Tacna - Ana Rosa Olórtegui
Tumbes - Gisela Rodríguez
Ucayali - Wendy Sarmiento
USA Peru - Angie Shrimplin

Trivia
 Ingrid Yrivarren Paz withdrew Miss World 1992 pageant, because her visa application was denied by the South African Embassy and for some disagreements about her contract with the national director.
 Jessica Tapia went to Miss Latin America the following year and would enter Miss Perú 1994.
 Paloma La Hoz would enter Miss Perú 1997.

Judges

 Enrique Escardó - Owner of GENTE Magazine
 Irma Vargas Fuller - Coord. of Misses del Perú Organization
 Augusto Belmont - Manager of CELIMA S. A.
 José Rodríguez Banda - Manager of Gloria S.A
 Dr. Max Álvarez - Plastic Surgeon
 Lourdes Berninzon - Peruvian Actress & Miss Peru '75
 Norka Peralta del Águila - Peruvian Designer
 Gisela Valcárcel - Peruvian TV presenter
 Samy Suárez - Cuban hair stylist
 Alberto Beingolea - Sport Journalist
 Jaime Yzaga - Peruvian professional Tennis player
 Fahed Mitre - Peruvian Singer
 María Claudia Zavalaga - TV Journalist & Chica Gente '91

References 

Miss Peru
1992 in Peru
1992 beauty pageants